= Dereje and Habte =

Ethiopian comedy duo (1980s–2006)

- ደረጀ እና ሃብቴ

Comedy career
- Years active: 1980s–2006
- Medium: Television; stage; sketches
- Genres: Sketch comedy satire situational
- Subjects: Urban and rural life in Ethiopia; Social fabrics
- Former members: Dereje Haile; Habte Mitiku

Dereje and Habte (Amharic: ደረጀ እና ሃብቴ) were Ethiopian comedy duo consisted of comedian Dereje Haile and Habte Mitiku until Mitiku death in 2006. They were prominent and active from 1980s to mid 2000s via stage and televised performances.

== Background ==
The comedy duo was consisted of Dereje Haile and Habte Mitiku, who first met in 1980s. They appeared to stage shows and comedic sketches, becoming household names through their performance in 1990s. The duo has distinct personas: Dereje's character posed as loquacious, confident and witty while Habte character was more naïve, trustful and deceptive than his counterpart Dereje.

On 19 January 2006, Habte suddenly died after battling his longtime illness that frequently stayed away from stage performance. He was receiving treatment at Betezata Hopital in Addis Ababa after performing live in Israel twenty days earlier.
